Lake Manatee State Park (Lake Manatee State Recreation Area) is a  State Park in the U.S. state of Florida, located on the south shore of  Lake Manatee. It is made up of pine flatwoods, Sand Pine scrub, marshes, and hardwood forests.

Activities include canoeing and kayaking, camping, boating, picnicking, swimming. Among the wildlife of the park are alligators, turtles, osprey. Amenities include a 60-site campground, boat ramp, dock, and picnic area. The park is open from 8:00 am till sundown year-round.

External links

 Lake Manatee State Park at Florida State Parks
 Lake Manatee State Park at StateParks.com
 Lake Manatee State Recreation Area at abfla.com
 Lake Manatee State Recreation Area at Wildernet.com

Parks in Manatee County, Florida
State parks of Florida